Transience is a compilation album released in 2015 by British musician and record producer Steven Wilson. It compiles thirteen songs originally recorded between 2003 and 2015. The album was released as a CD and a limited-edition double LP.

Track listing

Charts

References

2014 compilation albums
Steven Wilson albums